Felipe de la Pozas (born 28 August 1933) is a Cuban basketball player. He competed in the men's tournament at the 1952 Summer Olympics.

References

External links
 

1933 births
Living people
Cuban men's basketball players
Olympic basketball players of Cuba
Basketball players at the 1952 Summer Olympics
Place of birth missing (living people)